Sergey Rozhnov (born 19 September 1982 in Moscow, Russia) is a Russian former professional boxer who competed during 2012. He defeated former heavyweight world title challenger Owen Beck in his only professional bout. As an amateur, Rozhnov represented Bulgaria at the 2004 Olympics and won a super-heavyweight bronze medal at the 2004 European Amateur Boxing Championships.

Amateur career
He participated in the 2004 Summer Olympics. There he was stopped in the first round of the Super heavyweight (+91 kg) division by Russia's eventual winner Alexander Povetkin.

Rozhnov won a bronze medal in the same division six months earlier, at the 2004 European Amateur Boxing Championships in Pula, Croatia.

Professional boxing record

External links
Yahoo! Sports
sports-reference

1982 births
Living people
Bulgarian male boxers
Heavyweight boxers
Boxers at the 2004 Summer Olympics
Olympic boxers of Bulgaria
Russian male boxers